Joseph Burton may refer to:
Joseph R. Burton (1852–1923), American politician
Joseph Burton (cricketer) (1873–1940), English cricketer
 Joseph William Burton (1892–1960), Canadian politician and farmer